Ernstalbrecht Stiebler (born 29 March 1934 in Berlin) is a German composer of mostly chamber, choral, piano, and organ works. His work has "three principal concerns: sonority, rhythm, and duration" leading "to a large and varied body of work".

Stiebler studied composition and piano at the Musikhochschule Hamburg, but had more important lessons at Darmstadt between 1958 and 1961, including studies with Karlheinz Stockhausen in 1959.

References

External links
Tre Media Musikverlage Karlsruhe: Ernstalbrecht Stiebler in German
marcusdick.net: Interview with Ernstalbrecht Stiebler (in German)

1934 births
Living people
Experimental composers
German classical composers
German male classical composers
20th-century German musicians
Hessischer Rundfunk people
Members of the Academy of Arts, Berlin
20th-century German male musicians